Ernesto Manuel Jimenez Cabrera (born 28 June 1989) is a Dominican international footballer who played college soccer last year for the San Diego Toreros, as a defender.

Career
Jimenez has played for All Boys reserve team.

International career
Jimenez was born in Miami (USA) to a Spanish father and a Dominican mother, but grew up in Santo Domingo. He made his international debut for Dominican Republic in 2008, and has appeared in FIFA World Cup qualifying matches.

References

1989 births
Living people
Soccer players from Miami
Dominican Republic footballers
Dominican Republic international footballers
Dominican Republic under-20 international footballers
Bauger FC players
Association football defenders